This is a list of American Chopper episodes.

Series overview

Original series 
{| class="wikitable plainrowheaders" style="text-align:center"
|-
! colspan="2" rowspan="2" style="width: 50pt;" | OverallSeason
! rowspan="2" style="width: 50pt;" | SeriesSeason
! rowspan="2" style="width: 50pt;" | Episodes
! colspan="2" | Originally aired
|-
! style="width: 125pt;" | Season premiere
! style="width: 125pt;" | Season finale
|-
| bgcolor="#005B9C" style="width: 10pt;" |
| colspan="2" | [[List of American Chopper episodes#Pilots (2002–2003)|Pilots]]
| 2
| 
| 
|-
| bgcolor="#4B0082" style="width: 10pt;" |
| [[List of American Chopper episodes#Season 1 (2003–2004)|1]]
| 1
| 29
| 
| 
|-
| bgcolor="#A4273E" style="width: 10pt;" |
| [[List of American Chopper episodes#Season 2 (2004–2005)|2]]
| 2
| 30
| 
| 
|-
| bgcolor="#699DD2" style="width: 10pt;" |
| [[List of American Chopper episodes#Season 3 (2005–2006)|3]]
| 3
| 25
| 
| 
|-
| bgcolor="#2FCE1F" style="width: 10pt;" |
| [[List of American Chopper episodes#Season 4 (2006–2007)|4]]
| 4
| 25
| 
| 
|-
| bgcolor="#FFFF00" style="width: 10pt;" |
| [[List of American Chopper episodes#Season 5 (2008)|5]]
| 5
| 26
| 
| 
|-
| bgcolor="#CF6CFF" style="width: 10pt;" |
| [[List of American Chopper episodes#Season 6 (2009–2010)|6]]
| 6
| 26
| 
| 
|-
|}

Series spin–off: Senior vs. Junior

Original series revival 
{| class="wikitable plainrowheaders" style="text-align:center"
|-
! colspan="2" rowspan="2" style="width: 50pt;" | OverallSeason
! rowspan="2" style="width: 50pt;" | SeriesSeason
! rowspan="2" style="width: 50pt;" | Episodes
! colspan="2" | Originally aired
|-
! style="width: 125pt;" | Season premiere
! style="width: 125pt;" | Season finale
|-
| bgcolor="#006161" style="width: 10pt;" |
| [[List of American Chopper episodes#Season 11 (2018)|11]]
| 7
| 8
| 
| 
|-
| bgcolor="#0000CD" style="width: 10pt;" |
| [[List of American Chopper episodes#Season 12 (2019)|12]]
| 8
| 8
| 
| 
|-
|}

Original series episodes

Pilots (2002–2003)

Season 1 (2003–2004)

Season 2 (2004–2005)

Season 3 (2005–2006)

Season 4 (2006–2007)

Season 5 (2008)

Season 6 (2009–2010)

Series spin-off: Senior vs. Junior episodes

Original series revival episodes

Season 11 (2018)

Season 12 (2019)

Specials

Original

Others

See also 
 American Chopper: Senior vs. Junior
 List of Orange County Choppers episodes
 Orange County Choppers bikes

References

Bibliography 
 American Chopper episode guide from Discovery.com
 American Chopper episode guide from TV.com

External links 
 Orange County Choppers
 Discovery Channel's American Chopper
 OCC Fan site
 American Chopper computer game
 American Chopper PlayStation 2 game

American Chopper
Lists of American non-fiction television series episodes
Lists of American reality television series episodes